The ARIA Music Award for Best Male Artist, is an award presented at the annual ARIA Music Awards, which recognises "the many achievements of Aussie artists across all music genres", since 1987. It is handed out by the Australian Recording Industry Association (ARIA), an organisation whose aim is "to advance the interests of the Australian record industry." The award is given to an Australian male artist who has had a single or an album appear in the ARIA Top 100 Singles Chart between the eligibility period, and is voted for by a judging academy, which comprises 1000 members from different areas of the music industry.

The award for Best Male Artist was first presented to John Farnham in 1987. Four artists Farnham, Diesel, Alex Lloyd, Gotye and Paul Kelly, hold the record for the most wins, with three each, followed by Jimmy Barnes, Flume and Nick Cave with two. Kelly holds the record for most nominations at 18.

This, and the ARIA Award for Best Female Artist was merged in 2021 to form a single award for ARIA Award for Best Artist. The change was designed to ensure that the ARIA Awards reflect and embrace equality and the true diversity of the music industry in 2021. The number of nominees for Best Artist was increased to ten.

Winners and nominees
In the following table, the winner is highlighted in a separate colour, and in boldface; the nominees are those that are not highlighted or in boldface.

Multiple wins and nominations

The following individuals received two or more Best Male Artist awards:

The following individuals received two or more Best Male Artist nominations:

References

External links
The ARIA Awards Official website

M